Ochyrotica celebica is a moth of the family Pterophoridae. It is found on Sulawesi, an island in Indonesia.

The wingspan is about 15 mm.

References

Moths described in 1988
Ochyroticinae